Poshal (also Romanized as Pashal; also known as Pūshāl, Pūshal, and Veshāl) is a village in Dehshal Rural District, in the Central District of Astaneh-ye Ashrafiyeh County, Gilan Province, Iran. In 2006, its population was 612, in 176 families.

See also 

 Paschal

References 

Populated places in Astaneh-ye Ashrafiyeh County